Anboto is a limestone mountain of the Western Basque Country, the highest peak of the Urkiola range and not far from the Urkiola mountain pass between Durango and Vitoria-Gasteiz.

Description 
An immense mass of limestone, very compact and of gray color, the mountain contains fossil remnants of massive prehistoric corals and large seashells.

The south face descends more smoothly toward the pass of Urkiolamendi; more even, it is used for the more popular routes of ascent.

The ascent, which can be carried out on any of its faces, requires in all cases certain care when passing next to the cliffs.

The Anboto is one of the most known and most characteristic summits of Biscay and of the Basque Country.

On its summit there is a geodesic vertex of second order.

Mythology 

Anboto has always been related to magic and mythology. In a cave close to its summit, the legend tells us that Mari, the "Lady of Anboto", has her main dwelling. Legend says that it is usual to see her in the mouth of the cave, on days with good weather, combing her pretty blond hair with a comb of gold in the sunshine. It is not rare either to see her spend nights as a great ball of fire in the sky above Anboto or other places of the Basque Country where she possesses dwellings like the nearby Oiz or Aizkorri. Depending on where she is found there will be good or bad weather.

Ascents 

Anboto can be reached from a great number of places. From the north it is a  ascent from the Atxondo valley. From Urkiolamendi the road begins at the famous sanctuary of San Antonio. From the valley of Atxarte begins the complete ascent of the crests, long but simple along Alluitz and Anboto. From Otxandio or Aramaio, stopping at the extensive grassy hillock of Zabalaundi, being able to climb from here directly to the top passing near the caves of the Lady of Amboto and the "Eye of Eskilar".

 
The most popular way consists of leaving from Urkiolamendi pass, to flank Mount Urkiolamendi arriving at Asuntze, then climbing right under the summit, to the hillock Pagozelai ascending its stony slopes (Arrueta) to the hillock of Agindi just west of the summit.

The North face is a rocky  climb that requires some rock climbing and can be very dangerous in bad weather conditions or ice.
 
Climbing times:
Urkiolamendi (2h)
Atxarte (4h, up to the crest)
Atxarte (2h 30 m, by Asuntze)
Aramaio (3h)
Arrazola (2h 15 m, north face)
Arrazola (3h, by Zabalaundi)

References

Sources
Mendikat
Web sobre Amboto
Las montañas

Geography of Biscay
Basque Mountains
Mountains of the Basque Country (autonomous community)